KaiserAir is a Charter Airline and FBO located in several Bay Area locations, Oakland International Airport and Sonoma County Airport. KaiserAir operates a fleet of charter aircraft and a FAA certified airline (which consist of three Boeing 737's). There is currently a weekly shuttle service to Hawaii operated by KaiserAir known as the Kona Shuttle, in addition to exclusive VIP charters for corporations, athletic teams, families and other large groups. KaiserAir also operates an aircraft sales department with both purchasing and selling aircraft. They are looking to expand to Livermore Municipal Airport in four phases. Some in the community oppose this, because of noise.

The company was originally part of the empire of industrialist Henry Kaiser.  It was sold off to its chief pilot in 1980.

History 
KaiserAir grew out of the flight department of industrialist Henry J. Kaiser.  The flight department was formed in 1946 to organize the transport requirements of the Kaiser group of companies.  The department flew Gulfstreams, Hawkers, Falcons and JetStars.  The flight department was renamed KaiserAir in 1977 when it became a subsidiary company of Kaiser Steel.  The company then began providing transport, maintenance and aircraft management services to third parties.  In 1980 Kaiser Steel sold the company to Ron Guerra, KaiserAir's chief pilot, for $150,000.  The Kona Shuttle, an exclusive air service to Hawaii for VIPS, used the KaiserAir terminal at Oakland International Airport.  When the companies providing these flights (Primaris Airlines and Ryan International Airlines) failed, KaiserAir acquired its first large passenger jet, a Boeing 737-700 and took on the service itself.  It initially flew under the certificate of Miami Air International, but in 2011 the company obtained a certificate of their own.  They have since acquired a further two Boeing 737s.

KaiserAir's past clients have included former U.S. Presidents, Royalty, Celebrities, and Fortune 500 Executives. KaiserAir's Boeing 737-500 was chartered for the Joe Biden 2020 Presidential Campaign.

KaiserAir's website suggests (without actually saying so) that they played a role in the design of the Hughes H-4 Hercules ("Spruce Goose") aircraft.  If true, this could only have been a very minimal part.  Prior to Henry Kaiser's collaboration with Howard Hughes on the project in 1942, Kaiser's "design" documentation consisted of no more that an artist's impression and a wishlist of capabilities.  In any case, Kaiser's organization possessed no aviation design capability.  After Hughes came on board all the serious design was done by Hughes and his designer Glenn Odekirk.

Operations 
KaiserAir's main operation is from Oakland International Airport where it runs its charter airline and fixed-base operator (FBO) services.  It has been operating from this site since 1946.  It has a second FBO at Santa Rosa Airport.  In 2011, KaiserAir had 150 employees across both sites.  KaiserAir has a large VIP lounge and other passenger facilities in one of its hangars at Oakland.  However, this is rarely used as the usual practice is to drive passengers directly from the airport gate to their aircraft.

KaiserAir wish to expand to Livermore Municipal Airport, but as of January 2021 have not submitted a planning application to the city of Livermore.  Plans include a terminal building, fuel facilities, hangar complex, and office buildings along with other infrastructure necessary for Boeing 737 operations. Some in the Livermore, Dublin, and Pleasanton community are opposed to the expansion, because of the noise it would create 

KaiserAir currently flies the San Jose Sharks NHL team.

Fleet 
KaiserAir operates a fleet of both charter (FAA part 135 certification)  and airline (FAA part 121 certification) aircraft. The Part 135 fleet consists of three Cessna Citations and Gulfstreams. While the Part 121 Fleet consists of three Boeing 737's, two of which are Next Generation. 

As of 2011 (when KaiserAir had only one Boeing 737) they had a total of approximately twenty jets and ten turboprops based at Oakland.

References

Further reading

Airlines based in California
Companies based in Oakland, California
1946 establishments in California